The Istituto Nazionale di Fisica Nucleare (INFN; "National Institute for Nuclear Physics") is the coordinating institution for nuclear, particle, theoretical and astroparticle physics in Italy.

History
INFN was founded on 8 August 1951, to further the nuclear physics research tradition initiated by Enrico Fermi in Rome, in the 1930s. The INFN collaborates with CERN, Fermilab and various other laboratories in the world. In recent years it has provided important contributions to grid computing.

During the latter half of the 1950s, the INFN designed and constructed the first Italian electron accelerator—the electron synchrotron developed in Frascati. In the early 1960s, it also constructed in Frascati the first ever electron-positron collider (ADA - Anello Di Accumulazione), under the scientific leadership of Bruno Touschek. In 1968, Frascati began operating ADONE (big AdA), which was the first high-energy particle collider, having a beam energy of 1.5 GeV. During the same period, the INFN began to participate in research into the construction and use of ever-more powerful accelerators being conducted at CERN.

The INFN has Sezioni (Divisions) in most major Italian universities and four national laboratories. It has personnel of its own, but it is mostly the main funding agency for high-energy physics in Italy. University personnel can be affiliated with INFN and receive from it research grants.

Laboratories
 Laboratori Nazionali del Gran Sasso, situated near the Gran Sasso mountain 
 Laboratori Nazionali di Legnaro, in Legnaro
 Laboratori Nazionali di Frascati, in Frascati
 Laboratori Nazionali del Sud, in Catania

Divisions

Presidents 
1954-1959  	Gilberto Bernardini
1960-1965 	Edoardo Amaldi
1966-1970 	Giorgio Salvini
1970-1975 	Claudio Villi
1976-1977 	Alberto Gigli Berzolari
1977-1983 	Antonino Zichichi
1983-1992 	Nicola Cabibbo
1993-1998 	Luciano Maiani
1998-2004 	Enzo Iarocci
2004-2011 	Roberto Petronzio
2011-2019      Fernando Ferroni
2019-          Antonio Zoccoli

See also 
 Touschek effect - an effect first observed in ADA and explained by Bruno Touschek (after whom it is now named), whereby the beam lifetime of storage rings is reduced due to loss of the colliding particles from scattering.
 Møller scattering
 FLUKA
 The INFN Grid Project: INFN involvement in grid computing
 AURIGA: a gravitational wave experiment
 European Gravitational Observatory, a collaboration with CNRS of France

References

External links
 Official website

Institutes associated with CERN
Physics institutes in Italy